Jeffrey A. Winters is an American political scientist at Northwestern University, specialising in the study of oligarchy. He has written extensively on Indonesia and on oligarchy in the United States. His 2011 book Oligarchy was the 2012 winner of the American Political Science Association's Luebbert Award for the Best Book in Comparative politics.

References

Living people
American political scientists
Northwestern University faculty
1960 births